Lunumiris (Sinhala:ලුණු මිරිස් [lunu-miris] means salt and chillies in Sinhalese. Traditionally it is made with ground chillies and salt mixed together into a paste. Some also refer it as "Katta Sambal" but Katta sambal or sambol has Maldive fish in the recipe along with shallots and salt. [Sinhala:කට්ට සම්බෝල [kaṭṭa sambōla]]) is a spicy Sri Lankan sambal paste served as a condiment. It consists of chili pepper, shallots, Maldive fish, sea salt, black pepper and lime juice, usually ground with a mortar and pestle or a grind stone.

This paste is typically a bit spicy because of the chili powder added.

Etymology 
The translation of Sinhala word Lunumiris loosely translates to Salt Chili in Sinhala. That is because the original version of Lunumiris was made only with chili powder, and salt.

Usage 
Usually Kiribath, appam, bread, rice and roti can be eaten with Lunumiris. This can be eaten almost with any food as a side dish.

Ingredients 
Lunumiris contains chili pepper, shallots, Maldive fish, sea salt, black pepper and a little bit of lime juice. This can be made vegetarian, without Maldive fish. This type is hot, but wet, and a little bit crispy because of shallots. This should be made with mortar and pestle, or grind stone. This can be made also with hands, but it doesn't give the real taste.

Original version of this is made only with chili powder, sea salt, and lime juice. That is spicy and balances out with salt and lime. This can be made by hands.

References

External links
How To Make Lunu Miris on srilankacooking.com
Recipe on infolanka.com

Sri Lankan condiments
Herb and spice mixtures